The Battle of Bobrujsk took place between February 2 – March 11, 1918. Units of the Polish I Corps in Russia, commanded by General Jozef Dowbor-Musnicki, fought with the Red Army over the control of the city of Babruysk (Polish: Bobrujsk), located in eastern Belarus.

On July 24, 1917, Jozef Dowbor-Musnicki, who was a General of the Imperial Russian Army and an ethnic Pole, created a Polish tactical-operational unit of the Russian Army: one of the first such units during World War I. After the October Revolution of 1917, headquarters of the Polish I Corps in Russia decided to operate in Belarus, in the area marked by the towns of Rahachow – Zlobin – Babruysk.

In January 1918, the First Polish Corps, with its 30 000 soldiers, clashed for the first time with the Red Army, which pushed westwards. Polish troops captured Rahachow, but General Musnicki's target was the Babruysk with its fortress. As Musnicki stated, its capture would enable his soldiers to regroup and organize an effective defence. The siege of Babruysk began on February 2: the town and the fortress were defended by some 7000 Bolshevik soldiers, who capitulated on the next day, February 3. Poles captured large warehouses with food and ammunition. The Soviets decided to recapture the town, and initiated several assaults, all of which failed.

After the Treaty of Brest-Litovsk, Soviet Russia handed Babruysk over to the Imperial German Army. Under the circumstances, General Dowbor-Musnicki had to evacuate the town, leaving it in German hands.

The Battle of Bobrujsk is commemorated on the Tomb of the Unknown Soldier, Warsaw, with the inscription "BOBRUJSK 2 II – 11 III 1918".

Sources 
 Wacław Lipiński, Walki o niepodległość Polski w latach 1905 – 1918, Wolumen, Warszawa 1990
 Henryk Bagiński, Wojsko Polskie na Wschodzie 1914 – 1920, Warszawa 1990, reprint
 Mieczysław Wrzosek, Polski czyn zbrojny podczas pierwszej wojny światowej 1914–1918, Państwowe Wydawnictwo "Wiedza Powszechna", Warszawa 1990

Bobruysk 1918
Bobruysk 1918
Bobruysk 1918
Babruysk